V:MX is an on-demand music television service available only on TalkTalk TV as part of its music package, along with four other music channels. It offers around 8,000 music videos, and is the largest on-demand music video service available in the UK. V:MX is available across a number of channels:

 V:MX Taste – A continuous run of music videos; the viewer can skip to another song at any time (Ch. 11, can be viewed without Music package)
 V:MX Central – Library of all music videos available with Top 100 chart, New Videos list, and special playlists (i.e. Worst Videos, Now and Then) (Ch. 400)
 V:MX Chart – A countdown of the most watched music videos on V:MX (Ch. 401)
 V:MX Search (Ch. 404)
 V:MX Urban – Rap, hip hop, and R'n'B music videos (Ch. 405)
 V:MX Pop – Pop music videos (Ch. 411)
 V:MX Easy – Chillout music videos (Ch. 413)
 V:MX Alt – Alternative music videos (Ch. 415)
 V:MX Dance – Dance music videos (Ch. 416)
 V:MX Retro – Music videos from the 70s, 80s and 90s (Ch. 417)
 My V:MX – User playlist of favourited songs (Ch. 991)

External links 
 TalkTalk TV
 TalkTalk

Television channels in the United Kingdom